Andrea Settembrini (born 10 December 1991) is an Italian professional footballer who plays as a midfielder for  club Arezzo.

Club career
After two successful seasons at Pontedera, Settembrini signed a two-year contract with Lega Pro club FeralpiSalò in July 2015.

On 26 July 2019, he signed with Entella.

On 22 July 2021, he joined Serie C club Padova.

On 27 June 2022, Settembrini moved to Arezzo in Serie D.

International career
Settembrini represented Italy at the 2013 Summer Universiade. He received a red card in their opening fixture against Malaysia on 5 July and was forced to sit out their match against Great Britain three days later.

Personal life
He lives in the small town of Desenzano del Garda on the southwestern shore of Lake Garda in northern Italy. In September 2016, Settembrini graduated from the University of Perugia with a degree in sports medicine.

References

External links

 Profile at Goal.com
 

1991 births
Living people
Sportspeople from Arezzo
Italian footballers
Association football midfielders
Serie B players
Serie C players
Serie D players
A.C. Sansovino players
U.S. Pianese players
U.S. Poggibonsi players
U.S. Città di Pontedera players
FeralpiSalò players
A.S. Cittadella players
Virtus Entella players
Calcio Padova players
S.S. Arezzo players
University of Perugia alumni
Footballers from Tuscany